Lepismium warmingianum is a species of plant in the family Cactaceae. It is found in Argentina, Brazil, and Paraguay. Its natural habitat is subtropical or tropical moist lowland forests. It is threatened by habitat loss.

References

warmingianum
Flora of Argentina
Flora of Brazil
Flora of Paraguay
Taxonomy articles created by Polbot